Coptocheilus is a genus of  land snails with an operculum, terrestrial gastropod mollusks in the subfamily Pupinellinae of the family Pupinidae.

Species
Species within the genus Coptocheilus include:
 Coptocheilus altus (G. B. Sowerby I, 1842)
 Coptocheilus anostomus (Benson, 1852)
 Coptocheilus chinensis (L. Pfeiffer, 1857)
 Coptocheilus cochinchinensis (Rochebrune, 1882)
 Coptocheilus doriae (Issel, 1874)
 † Coptocheilus electrothauma (Asato & Hirano in Hirano et al., 2019) 
 Coptocheilus funiculalus (Benson, 1838)
 Coptocheilus inermis Bavay & Dautzenberg, 1909
 Coptocheilus leferi (Morelet, 1861)
 Coptocheilus longyanensis (W.-C. Zhou, W.-H. Zhang & D.-N. Chen, 2009)
 Coptocheilus maunautim C. T. Bui & Páll-Gergely, 2020
 Coptocheilus maydelineae (Páll-Gergely, P.K. Nguyen & Y. Chen, 2019)
 Coptocheilus mcgregori Bartsch, 1909
 Coptocheilus messageri Bavay & Dautzenberg, 1909
 Coptocheilus quadrasi (Hidalgo, 1890)
 Coptocheilus sectilabris (A. Gould, 1844)
 Coptocheilus sumatranus Dohrn, 1881
 † Coptocheilus supracretaceus (Tausch, 1886) 
 Coptocheilus tanychilus (Godwin-Austen, 1876)
 Coptocheilus yangi Z.-Y. Chen, 2021
Species brought into synonymy
 Coptocheilus altum (G. B. Sowerby I, 1842): synonym of Coptocheilus altus (G. B. Sowerby I, 1842) (incorrect gender ending for Coptocheilus altus (G. B. Sowerby I, 1842))
 Coptocheilus pauperculus (G. B. Sowerby I, 1850): synonym of Coptocheilus funiculalus (Benson, 1838) (unaccepted > junior subjective synonym)
 Coptocheilus perakensis Fulton, 1903: synonym of Schistoloma sumatranum (Dohrn, 1881): synonym of Coptocheilus sumatranus Dohrn, 1881 (junior synonym)

References

 Varga. A. (1972). Neue Schnecken-Arten aus Vietnam (Gastropoda, Cyclophoridae). Annales Historico-Naturales Musei Nationalis Hungarici. 64: 133–137.
 Bank, R. A. (2017). Classification of the Recent terrestrial Gastropoda of the World. Last update: July 16th, 2017.

External links

 Gould, A. A. (1862). Descriptions of new genera and species of shells. Proceedings of the Boston Society of Natural History. 8: 280-284
 Bartsch, P. (1915). The Philippine land shells of the genus Schistoloma. Proceedings of the United States National Museum. 49(2104): 195–204, pl. 51
 Sandberger, C.L.F. (1870-1875). Die Land- und Süßwasser-Conchylien der Vorwelt. C. W. Kreidel, Wiesbaden
 Kobelt W. (1902). Das Tierreich. Eine Zusammenstellung und Kennzeichnung der rezenten Tierformen. 16. Lieferung. Mollusca. Cyclophoridae. Das Tierreich. XXXIX + 662 pp., 1 map. [July. Berlin (R. Friedländer).]

 
Pupinidae